Alamarathupatti is the name of a village 4 km from Thiruthangal and 6 km from Sivakasi in Virudunagar district, Tamil Nadu.  Alamarathupatti is surrounded by other villages like Sengamalapatti, Naranapuram, Chellaiyanaiyakanpatti and towns Thiruthangal and Sivakasi.

Notable persons 
J. Balagangadharan, the former member of Tamil Nadu Legislative Assembly, is from this village.

References

External links
MAP

Villages in Virudhunagar district